Marco Koch (born 25 January 1990) is a German competitive swimmer who specializes in breaststroke events. He is a former world record holder in the 200 meter breaststroke (short course).

Career
At the 2012 Summer Olympics in London, he competed in the men's 200-meter breaststroke, finishing in 11th place overall in the heats and 7th in his semifinal (13th overall), failing to reach the final.

At the 2015 World Aquatics Championships in Kazan, Russia, he won the gold medal in the men's 200-meter breaststroke, becoming the first German to claim a championship title in that event. 

At the 2016 Summer Olympics in Rio de Janeiro, he competed in the 200 m breaststroke. He finished in 7th place with a time of 2:08.00. He was also part of the 4 x 100 medley relay team which finished in 7th place.

In the Autumn of 2019 he was member of the inaugural International Swimming League swimming for the New York Breakers, who competed in the Americas Division. Koch competed at all of the meets for the Breakers, and specialized in the breaststroke events. 

In the second ISL season he competed again for the NY Breakers winning in the play-offs four out four 200m breaststroke races with the highest jackpot ever - 30 points. In his third race in Budapest he almost broke the world record by swimming a 2:00,58.

Although he mainly specializes in breaststroke, Koch also holds the German record in the 400-meter individual medley (short course) with a time of 4:01.87.

References

German male swimmers
1990 births
Living people
Olympic swimmers of Germany
Swimmers at the 2012 Summer Olympics
Swimmers at the 2016 Summer Olympics
German male breaststroke swimmers
Male medley swimmers
Sportspeople from Darmstadt
European Aquatics Championships medalists in swimming
World Aquatics Championships medalists in swimming
Medalists at the FINA World Swimming Championships (25 m)
World record holders in swimming
Swimmers at the 2020 Summer Olympics
20th-century German people
21st-century German people